Te Kura Rongo Ngata-Aerengamate (born 21 October 1991) is a New Zealand rugby footballer who has represented New Zealand in rugby union and the Cook Islands in rugby league.

Personal life 
Ngata-Aerengamate taught at Tangaroa College and now teaches at Kaitaia College. She teaches the Maori language and P.E. She is of Maori and Cook Island descent.

Rugby career

Rugby Union 
Ngata-Aerengamate debuted for the Black Ferns in 2014 against Australia. She was named in the Black Ferns squad for the 2017 Women's Rugby World Cup in Ireland. She led the haka at the World Cup.

Ngata-Aerengamate played for the Blues against the Chiefs in the first-ever women's Super Rugby match in New Zealand on 1 May 2021. On 3 November 2021, she was named in the Blues squad for the inaugural Super Rugby Aupiki competition.

Rugby League 
Ngata-Aerengamate played for the Cook Islands at the 2017 Women's Rugby League World Cup, and in rugby league nines at the 2018 Rugby League Commonwealth Championship, scoring a try against Canada.

References

External links 
 Black Ferns Profile

1991 births
Living people
Cook Islands women's national rugby league team players
New Zealand female rugby union players
New Zealand women's international rugby union players
New Zealand Māori rugby union players
New Zealand female rugby league players
New Zealand sportspeople of Cook Island descent
New Zealand Māori people
Rugby league hookers
Rugby league locks
Rugby union hookers